This is a list of all the reasons written by Marshall Rothstein during his tenure as puisne justice of the Supreme Court of Canada.

2006

2007

2008
 British Columbia v Zastowny, [2008] 1 SCR 27; 2008 SCC 4	(Maj)
 R v Beatty, [2008] 1 S.C.R. 49; 2008 SCC 5 (Maj)
 620 Connaught Ltd v Canada (AG), [2008] 1 SCR 131; 2008 SCC 7 (Maj)
 Design Services Ltd v Canada, [2008] 1 SCR 737, 2008 SCC 22 (Maj)
 R v DB, [2008] 2 SCR 3, 2008 SCC 25 
 Canada v McLarty, [2008] 2 SCR 79, 2008 SCC 26 
 Redeemer Foundation v Canada (National Revenue), [2008] 2 SCR 643, 2008 SCC 46 
 R v LTH, [2008] 2 SCR 739, 2008 SCC 49 
 FH v McDougall, [2008] 3 SCR 41, 2008 SCC 53 
 Apotex Inc v Sanofi‑Synthelabo Canada Inc, [2008] 3 SCR 265, 2008 SCC 61 (Maj)
 Canadian National Railway Co v Royal and Sun Alliance Insurance Co of Canada, [2008] 3 SCR 453, 2008 SCC 66 (Dis)

2009
 Lipson v Canada, 2009 SCC 1, [2009] 1 SCR 3 (Dis)
 Shafron v KRG Insurance Brokers (Western) Inc, 2009 SCC 6, [2009] 1 SCR 157 (Maj)
 Ermineskin Indian Band and Nation v Canada, 2009 SCC 9, [2009] 1 S.C.R. 222 (Maj)
 Canada (Citizenship and Immigration) v Khosa, 2009 SCC 12, [2009] 1 S.C.R. 339 
 United Parcel Service Canada Ltd v Canada, 2009 SCC 20, [2009] 1 S.C.R. 657 
 R v Ouellette, 2009 SCC 24, [2009] 1 S.C.R. 818 
 Caisse populaire Desjardins de l'Est de Drummond v Canada, 2009 SCC 29, [2009] 2 S.C.R. 94 
 R v Layton, 2009 SCC 36, [2009] 2 S.C.R. 540 
 R v Bjelland, 2009 SCC 38, [2009] 2 S.C.R. 651 
 Nolan v Kerry (Canada) Inc, 2009 SCC 39, [2009] 2 S.C.R. 678 
 Northrop Grumman Overseas Services Corp v Canada (AG), 2009 SCC 50, [2009] 3 S.C.R. 309
 Consolidated Fastfrate Inc v Western Canada Council of Teamsters, 2009 SCC 53, [2009] 3 S.C.R. 407

2010

{| width=100%
|-
|
{| width=100% align=center cellpadding=0 cellspacing=0
|-
! bgcolor=#CCCCCC | Statistics
|-
|

2011
{| width=100%
|-
|
{| width=100% align=center cellpadding=0 cellspacing=0
|-
! bgcolor=#CCCCCC | Statistics
|-
|

2012

{| width=100%
|-
|
{| width=100% align=center cellpadding=0 cellspacing=0
|-
! bgcolor=#CCCCCC | Statistics
|-
|

2013

{| width=100%
|-
|
{| width=100% align=center cellpadding=0 cellspacing=0
|-
! bgcolor=#CCCCCC | Statistics
|-
|

2014

{| width=100%
|-
|
{| width=100% align=center cellpadding=0 cellspacing=0
|-
! bgcolor=#CCCCCC | Statistics
|-
|

2015

{| width=100%
|-
|
{| width=100% align=center cellpadding=0 cellspacing=0
|-
! bgcolor=#CCCCCC | Statistics
|-
|

Rothstein